The monarchy of Belize is a system of government in which a hereditary monarch is the sovereign and head of state of Belize. The current Belizean monarch and head of state since 8 September 2022, is King Charles III. As sovereign, he is the personal embodiment of the Belizean Crown. Although the person of the sovereign is shared with 14 other independent countries within the Commonwealth of Nations, each country's monarchy is separate and legally distinct. As a result, the current monarch is officially titled King of Belize and, in this capacity, he and other members of the royal family undertake public and private functions as representatives of the Belizean state. However, the King is the only member of the royal family with any constitutional role.

All executive authority is vested in the monarch, and royal assent is required for the National Assembly to enact laws and for letters patent and Orders in Council to have legal effect. Most of the powers are exercised by the elected members of parliament, government ministers, and judges. Other powers vested in the monarch are significant but are treated only as reserve powers and as an important security part of the role of the monarchy.

The Crown today primarily functions as a guarantor of continuous and stable governance and a nonpartisan safeguard against the abuse of power. While some powers are exercisable only by the sovereign, most of the monarch's operational and ceremonial duties are exercised by his representative, the governor-general of Belize.

Origins

In 1836, after the emancipation of Central America from Spanish rule, the British claimed the right to administer the region nowadays known as Belize. In 1862, the Settlement of Belize in the Bay of Honduras was declared a British colony called British Honduras, and the crown's representative was elevated to a lieutenant governor, subordinate to the governor of Jamaica.

Under a new constitution, Britain granted British Honduras self-governance in 1964. On 1 June 1973, British Honduras was officially renamed Belize. Independence from Britain was granted on 21 September 1981, following the signing of the Belize Independence Order in 1981 by Queen Elizabeth II, which made Belize a sovereign state and an independent constitutional monarchy.

Prince Michael of Kent represented the Queen at the independence celebrations. In the capital, Belmopan, in the morning of 21 September, Prince Michael handed the instruments of independence to George Price, who became the prime minister of independent Belize. Minita Gordon, a sociologist, was appointed governor-general by the Queen the same day.

The Belizean Crown and its aspects

The sovereign of Belize is shared with 14 other Commonwealth realms, members of the Commonwealth of Nations that share the same person as sovereign. However, the monarch's relationship with Belize is completely independent from his position as monarch of any other realm. Despite sharing the same person as their respective national monarch, each of the Commonwealth realms is sovereign and independent of the others.

Since independence in 1981, the Belizean Crown has had both a shared and a separate character and the sovereign's role as monarch of Belize is distinct to his or her position as monarch of any other realm, including the United Kingdom. Only Belizean ministers can advise the sovereign on matters of the Belizean state. The monarchy thus ceased to be an exclusively British institution and in Belize became a Belizean, or "domesticated" establishment.

This division is illustrated in a number of ways: The sovereign, for example, holds a unique Belizean title and, when he is acting in public specifically as a representative of Belize, he uses, where possible, Belizean symbols, including the country's national flag and the like.

In Belize, the legal personality of the state is referred to as the "Crown in Right of Belize", or "His Majesty in right of His Government in Belize", or the "Crown in right of His Majesty's Government in Belize".

Title

In Belize, the King's official title is: Charles the Third, by the Grace of God, King of Belize and of His Other Realms and Territories, Head of the Commonwealth.

This style communicates Belize's status as an independent monarchy, highlighting the sovereign's role specifically as Sovereign of Belize, as well as the shared aspect of the Crown throughout the Commonwealth realms. Typically, the sovereign is styled "King of Belize", and is addressed as such when in Belize.

Succession

Like some realms, Belize defers to United Kingdom law to determine the line of succession.

Succession is by absolute primogeniture governed by the provisions of the Succession to the Crown Act 2013, as well as the Act of Settlement, 1701, and the Bill of Rights, 1689. This legislation limits the succession to the natural (i.e. non-adopted), legitimate descendants of Sophia, Electress of Hanover, and stipulates that the monarch cannot be a Roman Catholic, and must be in communion with the Church of England upon ascending the throne. Though these constitutional laws, as they apply to Belize, still lie within the control of the British parliament, both the United Kingdom and Belize cannot change the rules of succession without the unanimous consent of the other realms, unless explicitly leaving the shared monarchy relationship; a situation that applies identically in all the other realms, and which has been likened to a treaty amongst these countries.

Upon a demise of the Crown (the death or abdication of a sovereign), it is customary for the accession of the new monarch to be proclaimed by the governor-general in the capital, Belmopan, after the accession. Regardless of any proclamations, the late sovereign's heir immediately and automatically succeeds, without any need for confirmation or further ceremony. An appropriate period of mourning also follows, during which flags across the country are flown at half-mast to honour the late monarch. The day of the funeral is likely to be a public holiday.

Constitutional role and royal prerogative

The Belizean Constitution gives Belize a similar parliamentary system of government as the other Commonwealth realms, in which all powers of the state are constitutionally reposed in the monarch, who is represented by the governor-general of Belize; appointed by the monarch upon the advice of the prime minister of Belize. The monarch's domestic duties are performed by this vice-regal representative.

The role of the monarch and the governor-general is both legal and practical; the Crown is regarded as a corporation, in which several parts share the authority of the whole, with the monarch as the person at the centre of the constitutional construct.

Executive
The governor-general is responsible for appointing a prime minister, who thereafter heads the Cabinet and advises the monarch or governor-general on how to execute their executive powers over all aspects of government operations and foreign affairs. The monarch is informed by the governor-general of the acceptance of the resignation of a prime minister and the swearing-in of a new prime minister and members of the ministry.

The governor-general also appoints and dismisses ministers, members of various executive agencies, and other officials, including senators.

There are also a few duties which must be specifically performed by the monarch, such as signing the appointment papers of governors-general.

As all executive authority of Belize is vested in the sovereign, the institutions of government are said to act under his authority; hence, the government of Belize is formally referred to as "His Majesty's Government in Belize".

Foreign affairs

The Royal Prerogative also extends to foreign affairs: the sovereign or the governor-general may negotiate and ratify treaties, alliances, and international agreements; no parliamentary approval is required. However, a treaty cannot alter the domestic laws of Belize; an Act of Parliament is necessary in such cases. The governor-general, on behalf of the monarch, also accredits Belizean High Commissioners and ambassadors, and receives diplomats from foreign states.

In addition, the issuance of passports falls under the Royal Prerogative and, as such, all Belizean passports are issued in the governor-general's name, the monarch's vice-regal representative.

National Assembly
The governor-general is responsible for summoning the two Houses of the National Assembly and may at any time prorogue or dissolve the National Assembly. At the opening of a new parliamentary session, the governor-general reads the Speech from the Throne, outlining the government's legislative agenda. A general election follows dissolution, the writs for which are dropped by the governor-general at Belize House.

Because the Belizean monarchy is a constitutional one, the powers that are constitutionally the monarch's are exercised almost wholly upon the advice of her prime minister and the ministers of the Crown in Cabinet, who are, in turn, accountable to the democratically elected House of Representatives, and through it, to the people. The monarch's role, and thereby the viceroy's role, is almost entirely symbolic and cultural, acting as a symbol of the legal authority under which all governments and agencies operate. In exceptional circumstances, however, the monarch or viceroy can act against such advice based upon his or her reserve powers.

All laws in Belize are enacted with the viceroy's signature. The granting of a signature to a bill is known as Royal Assent; it, and proclamation, are required for all acts of parliament, usually granted or withheld by the governor-general, with the Public Seal of Belize.

The authority of the Crown is embodied in the mace of the House of Representatives, which bears a crown at its apex; unlike other bicameral realms, however, the Belizean legislature only has a mace for the lower house.

Courts
The sovereign is responsible for rendering justice to all his subjects, and is thus traditionally deemed the fount of justice. In Belize, criminal offences are legally deemed to be offences against the sovereign and proceedings for indictable offences are brought in the sovereign's name in the form of The King versus [Name]. Hence, the common law holds that the sovereign "can do no wrong", and the monarch cannot be prosecuted in his or her own courts for criminal offences.

The appointment of the chief justice of Belize, and other justices of the Supreme Court also falls under the Royal Prerogative, and these duties are assigned to the governor-general by the Constitution.

The governor-general can also grant immunity from prosecution, exercise the "prerogative of mercy", and pardon offences against the Crown. Pardons may be awarded before, during, or after a trial. The exercise of the 'Prerogative of Mercy' to grant a pardon and the commutation of prison sentences in described in section 52 of the Belizean Constitution.

Cultural role

Belize celebrates the birthday of its monarch every year in May. The day is known as Sovereign's Day, and is marked by parades in Belize City, although it is not an official public holiday, like in the UK. Horse races, conducted by the National Sports Council, are held in Belize City's National Stadium and Orange Walk Town's People's Stadium. A cycling race, also arranged by the National Sports Council, is held between the cities of Belmopan and Cayo. There is a flag-raising ceremony among other events held at schools and universities to commemorate Sovereign's Day.

The Crown and honours

Within the Commonwealth realms, the monarch is deemed the fount of honour. Similarly, the monarch, as Sovereign of Belize, confers awards and honours in Belize in his name. Most of them are often awarded on the advice of "His Majesty's Belize Ministers".

Through the passage of the National Honours and Awards Act, Belize established three national orders on 16 August 1991: the Order of Belize, the Order of Distinction, and the Order of the National Hero. The monarch of Belize is the sovereign of all three orders, while the governor-general serves as the chancellor.

The Crown and the Defence Force

The Crown sits at the pinnacle of the Belize Defence Force. The monarch is the Commander-in-Chief of the entire Forces. The Crown of St. Edward appears on Belize Defence Force badges and rank insignia, which illustrates the monarchy as the locus of authority.

Under the Belizean Defence Act, every member of the Belize Defence Force must swear allegiance to the monarch of Belize, on taking office. The current oath is:

The Crown and the Police Force

Every member of the Belize Police Department has to swear allegiance to the monarch of Belize, on taking office. Under the Police Act of Belize, every police officer must make the following declaration on joining the Department:

All riot proclamations are also issued in the monarch's name and end with the phrase "God Save the King". 

St Edward's Crown is used on the badge of the Belize Police Department, and is incorporated into the rank insignias for commissioner, senior superintendent, and superintendent.

Royal symbols

The main symbol of the Belizean monarchy is the sovereign himself. Thus, framed portraits of him are displayed in public buildings and government offices. Many Belizeans also keep portraits of the royal family in their homes. All Belizean coins feature a crowned effigy of the monarch. All banknotes of the Belizean dollar feature the monarch's portrait on the obverse. The monarch also appears on commemorative Belizean stamps.

A crown is also used to illustrate the monarchy as the locus of authority, appearing on police force, postal workers, prison officers, and Belize Defence Force regimental and maritime badges and rank insignia.

God Save the King is the royal anthem of Belize.

Under the Belizean Oath of Citizenship, new Belizean citizens have to take a pledge of allegiance to the monarch of Belize, and his heirs and successors.

Royal visits
Princess Margaret visited Belize in 1958. The Duke of Edinburgh visited in 1962. Prince Michael of Kent represented the Queen at the independence celebrations in September 1981.

Queen Elizabeth II, visited Belize in October 1985. She was welcomed by the mayor and given the key to Belize City. She spent the night in Government House before flying to Dangriga the following day where they watched a Junkanoo Dance by children and received a painting from the people of the Stann Creek District. She also met British Servicemen and women stationed in Belize. During the visit, the Queen was served the famous gibnut during an official dinner. The next day, the British press in London ran headlines: "Queen Eats Rat in Belize". Ever since, the gibnut has often been referred to as "The Royal Rat", or "The Queen's Rat" in Belize.

The Duke of Edinburgh returned in 1988 for a solo visit in his capacity as President of the World Wide Fund for Nature.

The Queen visited again in 1994. On her arrival at the airport in Belize City, she was greeted by 90% of the city's population. The Queen also visited the towns of San Ignacio and Punta Gorda. The Queen attended a special sitting of the National Assembly, addressed the body for the first time and spoke of Belize's "robust democracy". She also visited Cahal Pech, one of Belize's many Mayan archaeological sites.

21st century

The Princess Royal visited Belize in April 2001. The Princess visited the National Assembly of Belize at Belmopan, and the Belize Defence Force, Price Barracks, Ladyville, Belize City. During her visit, The Princess also visited San Lazaro Village Roman Catholic Primary School at Orange Walk, the Mennonite Community at Blue Creek Village, the Rio Bravo Conservation and Management Area, Marla's House of Hope, NOPCA Saves – Children's Home (National Organisation for the Prevention of Child Abuse), Belize Zoo, and the Commonwealth War Graves at Lord's Ridge Cemetery at Belize City.

In 2012, Prince Harry visited on the Queen's behalf to mark her Diamond Jubilee. During his visit, the Prince visited the remains of the ancient Mayan city of Xunantunich, launched a canoe named in honour of the Queen, and attended officially naming of the 'Her Majesty Queen Elizabeth II Boulevard' in Belmopan.

The Duke and Duchess of Cambridge visited in March 2022 on the occasion of the Queen's Platinum Jubilee. During their visit, the couple visited Mayan sites, explored Belize's Maya chocolate making, and celebrated the culture of the Garifuna community in Hopkins. The Duke and Duchess also learned about the restoration efforts of Belize's barrier reef being led by communities across the country, and scuba-dived to learn more about the second-largest barrier reef in the world. At the reception hosted by Governor-General Dame Froyla Tzalam in celebration of the Queen's Platinum Jubilee, the Duke said, "Now we know why Belize is so lovingly referred to as the Jewel. We hope to return again soon and to show our children this wonderful country. They are rather jealous that they're not here with us now". A visit to a Maya village in southern Belize was also planned, but was cancelled due to local protests.

Several days after the visit concluded, the government of Belize indicated that they were creating a new body, the People's Constitutional Commission to consult the public on the decolonisation and becoming a republic.

List of Belizean monarchs

See also

	
 Lists of office-holders
 List of prime ministers of Elizabeth II
 List of prime ministers of Charles III
 List of Commonwealth visits made by Elizabeth II
 Monarchies in the Americas
 List of monarchies

Footnotes

External links 
 Belize at The Royal Family website
 Government of Belize: Governor-General of Belize
 Constitution of Belize

Government of Belize
Politics of Belize
Heads of state of Belize
1981 establishments in Belize
Monarchies of North America
Belize
Kingdoms